Lasius paralienus is a species of ant belonging to the family Formicidae.

It is native to Europe.

References

Lasius
Insects described in 1992